"B with Me" is a song by British girl group Mis-Teeq. It was written by band members Alesha Dixon, Su-Elise Nash, and Sabrina Washington along with Mushtaq for their debut album, Lickin' on Both Sides (2001). Rather than the album version, Grant Nelson's Bump & Flex garage remix of the song was chosen as the fourth single from the album. It reached number five on the UK Singles Chart. The music video features the group dancing on a beach scene, moving into a shack for Dixon's rap.

Track listings

UK CD single
 "B with Me" (Bump & Flex radio edit)
 "B with Me" (Mushtaq radio edit)
 "One Night Stand" (Stargate v. Sunship video edit)
 "B with Me" (Bump & Flex radio edit video)

UK cassette single
 "B with Me" (Bump & Flex radio edit)
 "B with Me" (Mushtaq radio edit)
 "One Night Stand" (Stargate v. Sunship video edit)

Australian CD single
 "B with Me" (Bump & Flex radio edit)
 "B with Me" (Mushtaq radio edit)
 "B with Me" (Rishi Rich Olde Skool mix)
 "B with Me" (Bump & Flex dub)
 "One Night Stand" (Stargate v. Sunship video edit)

Charts

Weekly charts

Year-end charts

Release history

References

2001 songs
2002 singles
Mis-Teeq songs
Music videos directed by Jake Nava
Songs written by Alesha Dixon
Songs written by Sabrina Washington
Songs written by Su-Elise Nash
Telstar Records singles
UK garage songs